Polyushko Pole is a Soviet Russian-language song.

Polyushko Pole may also refer to:

David Markish has a novel Polyushko-Polye about Nestor Makhno
Boris Mozhayev, a Soviet writer of "rustic style" wrote his Polyushko-Polye novel about kolkhoz life.
Polyushko Pole: Le Vent Vert ~ Le Temps Bleu, a 1998 single by Origa
Films
A 1956 Soviet film directed by Vera Stroyeva